The Liberal Democratic Party (LibDem) is a minor social liberal party in the Netherlands, founded in August 2006. The leader of the party is Sammy van Tuyll van Serooskerken.

Electoral results

Parliament

European Parliament

References

External links

  Official website

Political parties established in 2006
Liberal parties in the Netherlands
Social liberal parties